Makan is a name.

Notable people with the given name Makan include:
Makan Delrahim (born 1969), American assistant attorney general
Makan Dembélé (born 1986), Malian footballer
Makan Dioumassi (born 1972), French basketball player
Makan Hislop (born 1985), Trinidad and Tobago footballer 
Makan ibn Kaki (died 940), Daylamite military leader
Makan Konaté (born 1991), Malian football
Makan Traore (footballer, born 1992), French footballer

In India, Makan or Maken is found among Punjabi Khatris. Notable people with the surname Makan include:
Ajay Makan, commonly known as Ajay Maken, Indian politician
Hans-Peter Makan (born 1960), retired German footballer
Kyranbek Makan (born 1992), Chinese basketball player of Kyrgyz descent
Lalit Makan, commonly known as Lalit Maken, Indian politician

Indian surnames
Punjabi-language surnames
Surnames of Indian origin
Hindu surnames
Khatri clans
Khatri surnames